Millät Mäclese  (National Assembly) was a national assembly of Muslim Turko-Tatars of Inner Russia and Siberia that was created by the decision of Second  All-Russian Muslim Congress and worked in Ufa (Öfä) city from November 20, 1917 to January 11, 1918.

Sadri Mäqsudi was elected Millät Mäclese's Chairman; İbneämin Äxtämef and Ğabdraxman Fäxretdinef were elected  as Deputy Chairman and Secretary respectively.

Millät Mäclese did not recognize Soviet authority and decided to establish the Idel-Ural State. In order to  achieve this goal, the Commission for Implementation of the Idel-Ural State was established in January 1918. In the same month, the executive board of the future autonomy, Milli İdärä (National Board), was established. There were several commissions that worked under the Parliament: legislative assumptions commission, mandate commission, education commission, financial commission, religious commission, territorial autonomy commission, "national regions" commission.

Members 

 Zıyaetdin Kâmali (Ufa)
 Ğalimcan İbrahimof (Ufa)
 Ğömär Tereğolof (Ufa)
 İbneämin Äxtämef (Ufa)
 Miñleislam Ğosmanof (Ufa)
 Ğazıym Qasiymof (Ufa)
 İsmağil İslamğolof (Ufa)
 Şäyxulla Alkin (Ufa)
 Ğäbdelxäy Däwkäyef (Ufa)
 Ğäyazetdin Yaqupof (Ufa)
 Cämaletdin Xörämşin (Ufa)
 Salixcan Urmanof (Ufa)
 Zakir Qadıyri (Ufa)
 Möbäräkşa Xänäfi (Ufa)
 Möxetdin Äxmäref (Ufa)
 Äxmädetdin Möxämmätdinef (Ufa)
 Abruy Säyfi (Ufa)
 Ğömär Älmöxämmätef (Ufa)
 Sälimgäräy Cantürin (Ufa)
 Fatix Säyfi (Ufa)
 Musa Ismaqof (Ufa)
 Säläxetdin Atnağulof (Ufa)
 Fätxi Äxmädullin (Ufa)
 Mänsur Xaliqof (Ufa)
 Sähman İsxaqof (Ufa)
 Ğilemdar Bayembätef (Ufa)
 İlyas Alkin (Qazan)
 İsmäğil Ğabdi (Qazan)
 Sädri Mäqsudi (Qazan)
 Ğäbdelbari Battal (Qazan)
 Şähit Äxmädief (Qazan)
 Xäliulla Safiullin (Qazan)
 Säyet Waxitof (Qazan)
 Xänäfi Mozaffarof (Qazan)
 Ğataulla Bahawetdinef (Qazan)
 Wäli Ğällämef (Orenburg (Urınburğ))
 Ğäbdelğäziz Mortazin (Orenburg)
 Ğömär Ğäbdelbaqıyef (Orenburg)
 Ğarif Kitayef (Orenburg)
 Bican Ğäbbasof (Orenburg)
 İsxaq Ğädelgäräyef (Orenburg)
 Näcip Qorbanğälief (Orenburg)
 Hadi Atlasof (Samara (Samar))
 Xösnulla Bahawetdinef (Samara)
 Zakir Ayuxanof (Samar)
 Ğabdraxman Äxmäref (Ästerxan (Astrakhan))
 Şähit Ğäyfi (Ästerxan)
 Sadıyq Ğabdulof (Perm (Pirem))
 Ğirfan Raxmanqolof (Perm)
 Qasıym Xäzrätef (Perm)
 İbrahim Bikqolof (Simbrisk (Sember))
 Ğäbdessamat Şähidullin (Simbirsk)
 Xälil Bäkief (Simbrisk)
 Säğit Yanqılıçef (Saratov (Sarıtaw))
 Sadıyq Räximqolof (Saratov)
 Xäsän Tahirof (Tambov (Tambu))
 Äxmätfärit Şirvanof (Uralsk (Cayıq))
 Ğalim Aqçurin (Akmolinsk (Aqmola))
 Hadi Zöfäref (5th Army)
 İsmäğil Qäderlief (12th Army)
 Zıya Mälikef  (12th Army)
 Ğabdulla Ämiref (Romanian Front)
 Xösäyen Bornaşef (Romanian Front)
 Ğayaz İsxaqi (Moscow (Mäskäw))
 Xösäyen Baybäkef (Kasimov (Xankirmän))
 Ğabdraxman Fäxretdinef (Romanian Front)
 Ğosman Diwäyef (Kharkov (Xarkaw))
 Ğabraxman Raxmanqolof (1st Army)
 Ğäni Abızof (Rostov-on-Don)
 Ğäynulla Raxmanqolof (Caucasian Front)
 Fatix Möxämmätyarof (Southwestern Front)
 X. Yähüdin (Southwestern Front)
 Ğ. Fäyzraxmanof (Southwestern Front)
 Ğöbäydulla Bubıy (Vyatka (Wätke))
 Ğirfan Baltanof (Vyatka)
 Xälimbäk Yärmief (2nd Army)
 Cämil Ğälief (10th Army)
 Dawıt Yanalief (Penza (Pinzä))
 Ğabdulla Däweşef (Northern Russia)
 Xäbibulla Zäynetdinef (3rd Army)
 Ğäbdelcälil Ğabdraxmanof (Southwestern Front)
 Ğabdulla Söläymani (Nizhny Novgorod (Nijgar));

Another twenty people were elected but did not participate in the meetings, among them Mullanur Waxitof, Möxetdin Qorbanğälief, Rizaetdin Faxretdin, Xädiçä Yamaşeva (Tanaçeva).

Place of sessions 
Millät Mäclese's sessions were held at a house that belonged to Sämiğulla Şämğulof, a merchant, at the corner of Aleksandrovskaya (Aliksandırski) and Malaya Kazanskaya streets. Also, there were plans to move Millät Mäclese to Qazan, namely to Ğabdulla Säğdief's house at Yekaterininskaya (Yıkatirinski) Street.

References

External links 

 
 

History of Tatarstan
History of Bashkortostan
Defunct unicameral legislatures